The Roman Catholic Diocese of Providence is a diocese of the Catholic Church in the United States.  The diocese was erected by Pope Pius IX on February 17, 1872 and originally comprised the entire state of Rhode Island and the counties of Bristol, Barnstable, Dukes and Nantucket in the state of Massachusetts. On March 12, 1904, those four counties were separated from the Diocese of Providence to form the Diocese of Fall River, Massachusetts, leaving the Diocese of Providence with just the state of Rhode Island.

The diocese is suffragan to the Archdiocese of Hartford and a part of the ecclesiastical province that includes that archdiocese and the suffragan dioceses of Bridgeport and Norwich. The Cathedral of SS. Peter and Paul in Providence  is the mother church of the diocese of Providence. The Most Reverend Thomas Joseph Tobin, former Bishop of Youngstown, Ohio, is the eighth, and current, Bishop of Providence.

History
Before its creation as a separate diocese, the area that is now the Diocese of Providence was part of the Diocese of Hartford. The first bishop was Irish-born Thomas Francis Hendricken, former pastor of the Church of the Immaculate Conception in Waterbury, Connecticut. He set to work at once to build an episcopal residence and a suitable cathedral. It was during his episcopate that the French Canadian Catholics began to come to the diocese in considerable numbers, first to Woonsocket and then to the various mill towns along the streams flowing into the Blackstone River and the Pawtuxet River, and above all to Fall River, Massachusetts.

Rt. Rev. Matthew Harkins succeeded Bishop Hendricken. Born in Boston November 17, 1845, he was ordained in Paris in 1869. The Vatican Council took place while he was continuing his studies in Rome. Formerly pastor of St. James' parish, Boston, he was consecrated on April 14, 1887, in the new Cathedral of Sts. Peter and Paul in Providence. He instituted a parochial assessment for the support of the orphan asylum. Through the generosity of Joseph Banigan the Home for the Aged in Pawtucket was built in 1881. Mr. Banigan also built the large St. Maria Working Girls' Home in Providence in 1894. St. Joseph's Hospital was begun in 1891 and the St. Vincent de Paul Infant Asylum in the following year; the Working Boys' Home began in 1897, the House of the Good Shepherd in 1904, Nazareth Home (a day-nursery, that also supplied nurses in the homes of the poor) in 1906. In Woonsocket and Newport and other parts of the diocese similar charitable institutions were erected at the suggestion and advice of Bishop Harkins. 
His episcopacy saw the growth of national parishes serving a particular ethnicity, as more immigrants arrived in the diocese. Almost twenty parishes out of a total of seventy-nine were exclusively French Canadian, while there were a few small parishes of mixed French and English-speaking Catholics. Two churches for Italian Catholics were dedicated in Providence in 1910. Four Polish parishes were erected, as well as one serving the Portuguese in Providence. There was also a Syrian parish in Central Falls.

Bishop William Hickey was born in Worcester, Massachusetts and held a variety of pastoral roles throughout Worcester County. He was fluent in English, French, Polish and Lithuanian. On January 16, 1919, Hickey was appointed Coadjutor Bishop of Providence, Rhode Island and Titular Bishop of Claudiopolis in Isauria by Pope Benedict XV. He was immediately pronounced Apostolic Administrator for the diocese by the incumbent Bishop Matthew Harkins, whom Hickey succeeded as the third Bishop of Providence upon Harkin's death on May 25, 1921. Hickey founded a diocesan high school and a diocesan newspaper.

Francis Patrick Keough was born in New Britain, Connecticut, on December 30, 1890 and named after Bishop of Hartford Francis Patrick McFarland. He studied at the Seminary of St. Sulpice in France until in 1914, he was called home due to the outbreak of World War I. Ordained in 1916, he served as curate in Meriden, and then was made assistant chancellor of the Diocese of Hartford. Keough was ordained Bishop of Providence on May 22, 1934, at a time when most of the population was still dealing with the effects of the depression. He assigned chaplains to the units of the Civilian Conservation Corps working in Rhode island. In the fall of 1939, he purchased the Nelson W. Aldrich estate at Warwick Neck, Rhode Island, which had suffered damage in the 1938 New England hurricane and erected Our Lady of Providence Seminary. In 1947, Robert Wilson Goelet donated the family estate, Ochre Court to the Sisters of Mercy, who founded Salve Regina University there.

Bishop Russell J. McVinney studied at the Grand Seminary of Montreal in Quebec, Canada. After World War I, he complete his studies at the American College at Louvain in Belgium, where he ordained on July 13, 1924. He served as curate at a number of parishes before studying journalism at the University of Notre Dame in 1935. He then became associate editor of the Providence Visitor and as rector of Our Lady of Providence Seminary. He was consecrated fifth Bishop of Providence on the following July 14, 1948. from Archbishop Amleto Giovanni Cicognani, with Bishops Henry Joseph O'Brien and James Louis Connolly serving as co-consecrators. During his tenure in Providence, McVinney established 28 new parishes, and opened Our Lady of Fatima Hospital. He founded the Sisters of Our Lady of Providence in 1955 and later the Brothers of Our Lady of Providence in 1959. He attended all four sessions of the Second Vatican Council in Rome. He was instrumental in the establishment of the American College at Louvain after World War II.

On November 23, 2022 Pope Francis appointed Richard Garth Henning as coadjutor bishop of Providence; in accordance with canon law, once installed, he will have the right to succeed Bishop Thomas Tobin upon his retirement.

Bishops

The lists of associated bishops and their tenures of service as bishops in this diocese:

Bishops of Providence
  Thomas F. Hendricken (1872–1886)
  Matthew Harkins (1887–1921)
  William A. Hickey (1921–1933)
  Francis Patrick Keough (1934–1947), appointed Archbishop of Baltimore
  Russell Joseph McVinney (1948–1971)
  Louis Edward Gelineau (1972–1997)
  Robert Edward Mulvee (1997–2005; coadjutor bishop 1995-1997)
  Thomas Joseph Tobin (2005–present)

Coadjutor Bishops
Richard Garth Henning (2023-present)

Auxiliary bishops
Thomas Francis Doran (1915–1916)
Denis Matthew Lowney (1917–1918)
Thomas Francis Maloney (1960–1962)
Bernard Matthew Kelly (1964–1971)
Kenneth Anthony Angell (1974–1992), appointed Bishop of Burlington
Robert Joseph McManus (1999–2004), appointed Bishop of Worcester
Robert C. Evans (2009–2022)

Other priests of this diocese who became Bishops
Lawrence Stephen McMahon, appointed Bishop of Hartford in 1879
Austin Dowling, appointed Bishop of Des Moines in 1912
Ernest Bertrand Boland, O.P., appointed Bishop of Multan in Pakistan in 1966
Daniel Patrick Reilly, appointed Bishop of Norwich, CT in 1975. Appointed Bishop of Worcester, MA in 1994.
 Francis Xavier Roque, appointed Auxiliary Bishop for the Military Services, USA in 1983
Salvatore Ronald Matano, appointed Coadjutor Bishop of Burlington in 2005 and subsequently succeeded to that diocese; later appointed Bishop of Rochester

Diocesan Offices
The following is a list of some of the offices of the diocese.
Catholic Marriage, Diocese of Providence
Catholic School Office
Catholic Youth Ministry
Office of Catholic Cemeteries
Office of Ongoing Formation for Priests
Office of Religious Education
Office of Stewardship and Development
Office of Vocations

Education

High schools

Bishop Hendricken High School, Warwick
La Salle Academy, Providence
Mount Saint Charles Academy, Woonsocket
Portsmouth Abbey School, Portsmouth
Prout School, South Kingstown
St. Mary Academy – Bay View, East Providence
St. Patrick Academy, Providence
St. Raphael Academy, Pawtucket

Churches

Holy Trinity Parish (Woonsocket)
Notre Dame du Sacre Coeur, 666 Broad Street (Central Falls)
St. Joseph (Central Falls)
Our Lady of Czenstochowa (Coventry)
St. Paul (Cranston)
St. Joseph (Cumberland)
St. Mary (Newport)
St. John the Baptist (St. Jean-Baptiste) (Pawtucket)
Trinity – St. George (Pawtucket)
Cathedral of SS. Peter and Paul (Providence)
Our Lady of Lourdes (Providence)
St. Adalbert (Providence)
St. Joseph (Providence)
St. Casimir (Warren)
St. Mary's Church and Cemetery (West Warwick)
Immaculate Conception (Westerly)
L'Eglise du Precieux Sang (Woonsocket)
St. Charles Borromeo (Woonsocket)
St. Stanislaus Kostka (Woonsocket)

Publications
Established in 1875, the Rhode Island Catholic is the official newspaper of the Diocese of Providence. It is published weekly with 48 issues per year.

Reports of sex abuse
On July 1, 2019, the Diocese of Providence released a list of 50 clerics, religious order priests and deacons who were accused of committing acts of sex abuse. Many were actively removed from ministry between the years 1971 and 2016, though some were removed in the time after they left the Diocese of Providence One accused priest resigned in 1979 before he could be removed.  One priest listed was Irishman John Gerard Brendan, who became a priest in the Diocese of Providence in 1965, but was later granted leave from the Diocese of Providence in 1968. Brendan was later convicted of sex abuse in Belfast, Northern Ireland and died in prison in 1997. Another priest listed, John Petrocelli, was arrested on November 5, 2020 was arrested after a grand jury charged him with three counts of first-degree child molestation and nine counts of second-degree child molestation which stemmed from his time as an assistant pastor at Holy Family Parish in Woonsocket between Nov. 6, 1981 and Oct. 3, 1990.
 This came 18 years after Petrocelli was removed from ministry in 2002.

Arms

See also

Catholic Church in the United States
Ecclesiastical Province of Hartford
Global organisation of the Catholic Church
List of Catholic archdioceses (by country and continent)
List of Catholic dioceses (alphabetical) (including archdioceses)
List of Catholic dioceses (structured view) (including archdioceses)
List of the Catholic dioceses of the United States
Sexual abuse scandal in Providence diocese

References

External links
Roman Catholic Diocese of Providence Official Site
Cathedral of Sts. Peter and Paul
Rhode Island Catholic – diocesan newspaper

 
Catholic Church in Rhode Island
Providence
Providence
Providence
1872 establishments in Rhode Island